Goody is both a surname and  an honorific analogous to modern-day “Mrs,” as well as a nickname. Notable people with the name include:

Surname:
 Gordon Goody (1930–2016), British criminal, involved in the Great Train Robbery
 Jack Goody (1919–2015), British social anthropologist
 Jade Goody (1981–2009), British reality television star
 Joan E. Goody (1935–2009), American architect
 Laila Goody (born 1971), Norwegian actress
 Lancelot John Goody (1908–1992), Roman Catholic bishop then archbishop of Perth
 Nick Goody (born 1991), American baseball player
 Richard Goody (born 1921), emeritus professor of planetary physics at Harvard University
 Roger S Goody (born 1944), English biochemist

Honorific:
 Goody Cole or Eunice Cole, only woman convicted of witchcraft in New Hampshire
 Goody Osborne or Sarah Osborne, woman accused of witchcraft in the Salem witch trials of 1692 biochemist

Nickname:
 Goody Petronelli, (born 1923), American boxing trainer and co-manager
 Goody Rosen, (1912–1994), Canadian Major League Baseball All Star outfielder